Cordulia is a genus of dragonfly in the family Corduliidae.

Species 
The genus includes three species:
 Cordulia aenea  – downy emerald
 Cordulia amurensis 
 Cordulia shurtleffii  – American emerald

References

Corduliidae
Anisoptera genera
Taxa named by William Elford Leach